Macleay's honeyeater (Xanthotis macleayanus) is a honeyeater endemic to Australia. Within Australia it has a limited distribution, occurring only in northern Queensland from Cooktown to the southern end of the Paluma Range.  Its natural habitats are tropical dry forests and tropical moist lowland forests.

References

Macleay's honeyeater
Birds of Cape York Peninsula
Endemic birds of Australia
Macleay's honeyeater
Taxonomy articles created by Polbot